Hugh David Renwich Turnbull Allan, O.Praem. (born 3 August 1976) is a Premonstratensian canon regular and Roman Catholic priest who is the Apostolic Administrator of the Prefecture of the Falkland Islands and Ecclesiastical Superior of the Mission sui iuris of the islands of Ascension, St Helena and Tristan da Cunha.

Biography
Hugh Allan was born in Hertfordshire, England, to a Scottish family from the town of Auchtermuchty, located close to the village of Falkland. Raised as a Free Presbyterian, Allan converted to Catholicism at the age of 16. He trained to be a teacher at St Mary's University, Twickenham. On leaving university, he joined the Order of Canons Regular of Prémontré, also known as the Premonstratensians, the Norbertines or ‘White Canons'. Following his novitiate, he was sent to complete further studies at St Benet's Hall, Oxford. He made his solemn profession on 27 October 2001 and was ordained a priest on 22 November 2002 by Bishop Terence Brain.

Following ordination, he worked as a full-time school chaplain in North Manchester. In 2004, he was appointed parish priest of Gorton, Manchester. In 2006, he was appointed superior of the Norbertine community in Manchester, aged only 29. At the time, he was the youngest Catholic religious superior in the world. In 2008, the Norbertines opened a new Priory in Chelmsford and he was appointed superior to this new canonry. At the same time, he was appointed parish priest of Chelmsford and has also recently served as the Area Dean for Mid-Essex.

He was appointed Apostolic Administrator of the Falkland Islands and Ecclesiastic Superior of St. Helena, Ascension Island and Tristan da Cunha by Fernando Cardinal Filoni on 26 October 2016 for a period of five years. In recognition of this ecclesiastical appointment, Allan was also elevated to the title of Titular Abbot of Beeleigh by the Abbot General of the Norbertine Order, Thomas Handgrätinger, and by permission and agreement of the owners of Beeleigh Abbey Mr and Mrs Christopher Foyle, in which capacity he was officially installed on 8 December 2016.

References

External links
https://en.mercopress.com/2016/11/02/prefecture-of-the-falklands-has-new-apostolic-administrator-fr.-hugh-allan
https://m.ncregister.com/daily-news/the-biggest-diocese-you-have-never-heard-of

Living people
Converts to Roman Catholicism from Presbyterianism
Premonstratensian Order
21st-century English Roman Catholic priests
Falkland Islands Roman Catholics
1976 births
Alumni of St Benet's Hall, Oxford
Alumni of St Mary's University, Twickenham
English people of Scottish descent